Ulotrichopus trisa is a moth of the family Erebidae first described by Charles Swinhoe in 1899. It is found in India.

References

Moths described in 1899
Ulotrichopus
Moths of Asia